Lepidonia is a genus of Mesoamerican flowering plants in the daisy family.

 Species
 Lepidonia callilepis (Gleason) H.Rob. & Funk - Michoacán, Guerrero, Oaxaca
 Lepidonia corae (Standl. & Steyerm.) H.Rob. & V.A.Funk - Guatemala
 Lepidonia jonesii (B.L.Turner) H.Rob. & V.A.Funk - Oaxaca
 Lepidonia lankesteri (S.F.Blake) H.Rob. & V.A.Funk - Costa Rica
 Lepidonia mexicana (Less.) H.Rob. & Funk - Veracruz
 Lepidonia paleata S.F.Blake - Guatemala
 Lepidonia salvinae (Hemsl.) H.Rob. & Funk - Guatemala, Chiapas

References

Vernonieae
Asteraceae genera
Flora of North America